The Saint-Petersburg Elizabethan Institute (Russian: Санкт-Петербургский Елизаветинский институт) was a girls' school in Saint Petersburg in Russia between 1806 and 1918. It was a charity school, founded by Elizabeth Alexeievna (Louise of Baden) within the Patriotic Society (Russia). Originally a charity school with the purpose of educating the students in handicrafts to make the ideal wives and mothers but with the ability to support themselves if necessary, it became a fashionable girl school in the mid 19th-century.

References
 Срезневский В. И. Исторический очерк Санкт-Петербургского Елизаветинского института. 1808-1908. — СПб., 1908

Charities based in Russia
Social welfare charities
1806 establishments in the Russian Empire
1918 disestablishments in Russia
History of Saint Petersburg
Schools in Saint Petersburg
Educational institutions established in 1806
Girls' schools in Russia
Cultural heritage monuments in Saint Petersburg